Leonard Dixon (12 May 1896 – 21 November 1951) was a South African sprinter. He competed in the men's 100 metres at the 1920 Summer Olympics.

References

1896 births
1951 deaths
Athletes (track and field) at the 1920 Summer Olympics
South African male sprinters
Olympic athletes of South Africa
Sportspeople from Durban
Colony of Natal people